Ratoath was a constituency represented in the Irish House of Commons.

Borough
This constituency was the manor of Ratoath in County Meath.

Following the Act of Union 1800 the constituency was disenfranchised.

Members of Parliament
It returned two members to the Parliament of Ireland to 1800.

1661-1666 Richard Boughton (expelled for absence and replaced by Sir Robert Reading) and Dr Ralph King

1689–1801

Notes

Elections

References

See also
 List of Irish constituencies

Historic constituencies in County Meath
Constituencies of the Parliament of Ireland (pre-1801)
1800 disestablishments in Ireland
Constituencies disestablished in 1800